Ceramium circinatum is a small marine red algae.

Description
This small red alga is filamentous, cylindrical with branched axes. It has 10 periaxial cells, that is a ring of cells forming a ring around the axis. It is not completely corticated and does not bear spines. The apices of the branches are hooked inwards.

Distribution
This is a Mediterranean species. Records shown from Great Britain may be misidentifications as it may be mistaken as Ceramium virgatum. However, it is reported from Iceland where the species is red listed a vulnerable species (VU).

References

circinatum